Margit Carlqvist (born 11 February 1932 in Stockholm) is a Swedish actress. In Sweden she starred in many movies during the 1950s. Internationally, she may be best known for her role in Ingmar Bergman's film, Smiles of a Summer Night.

Selected filmography
To Joy (Till glädje, 1950)
 Stronger Than the Law (1951)
 Encounter with Life (1952)
 The Clang of the Pick (1952)
 She Came Like the Wind (1952)
 Marianne (1953)
 The Glass Mountain (1953)
 The Road to Klockrike (1953)
Taxi 13 (1954)
 Dance in the Smoke (1954)
 The Summer Wind Blows (1955)
 The People of Hemsö 
Smiles of a Summer Night (1955)
 My Passionate Longing (1956)
 Stage Entrance (1956)
 A Dreamer's Journey (1957)
 No Tomorrow (1957)
 Line Six (1958)
Love Mates (Änglar, finns dom?, 1961)
 The Lady in White (1962)
 Hide and Seek (1963)
Loving Couples (Älskande par, 1964)
We Are All Demons (1969)
The Lustful Vicar (Kyrkoherden, 1970)
The Last Adventure (Det sista äventyret, 1974)

External links

1932 births
Living people
Actresses from Stockholm
Swedish film actresses